Ernesto R. Knollin (May 23, 1888 – June 1981) was an American football, baseball, and soccer coach.

Soccer coaching career
Knollin was the head soccer coach at Stanford University in 1918, tallying a mark of 0–2.

Football coaching career
Knollin served as the head football coach at San Jose State University, from 1924 to 1928, compiling a record of 14–22–2.

Baseball coaching career
Knollin was also the head baseball coach at San Jose State, from 1925 to 1928, amassing a record of 27–14–1.

Head coaching record

Football

References

External links
 

1888 births
1981 deaths
San Jose State Spartans football coaches
San Jose State Spartans baseball coaches
Stanford Cardinal men's soccer coaches
American soccer coaches